is a Japanese manga series written and illustrated by Tsubasa Yamaguchi. The series has been serialized in Kodansha's seinen manga magazine Monthly Afternoon since June 2017 and has been collected in thirteen tankōbon volumes as of November 2022. The series is licensed in English by Kodansha USA. An anime television series adaptation produced by Seven Arcs aired from October to December 2021.

As of November 2021, the manga had over 4.5 million copies in circulation. In 2020, Blue Period was awarded the 44th Kodansha Manga Award in the General category and the Grand Prize of the 13th Manga Taishō award.

Premise
Yatora Yaguchi is a fairly popular student who excels in school, but secretly grapples with feelings of emptiness and frustration. When visiting his high school's art club he is inspired to pursue art. He eventually aspires to attend the Tokyo University of the Arts (TUA) after he graduates from high school.

Characters

An academically gifted and diligent student whose friends are disinterested in school. After developing an interest in painting from his art club senior Mori, he is set down a path to attend art school.

Yatora's friend and fellow art-club member. Yuka considers themselves to be a non-conformist and indifferent to the opinions of others. They were born a male but dresses in women's clothes. Throughout the series they struggle with their sexuality, gender identity, and pressure from their family. 

Yatora's classmate in prep school. He is stoic and aloof towards Yatora, often sharply criticizing his work and character. 

Yatora's classmate in prep school. Hashida dresses well and takes a very classical and theoretical approach to art, which shows in his work.

Another of Yatora's classmates from prep school. Her entire family attended TUA, and as a result she often struggles with feelings of inadequacy, despite being a highly talented artist in her own right.

Yatora's senior in his high school art club. To Mori art is a spiritual activity, and her pieces often incorporate images of religion and prayer. It is one of her works that spurs Yatora's interest in art.

The art teacher at Yatora's high school. She is his first art teacher and guides his first steps of him improving his artistic ability.

Yatora's teacher at prep school. She continually provides Yatora with valuable criticism and advice on how to overcome personal and technical obstacles as he continues with art. 
 

A friend of Yatora's from high school. He performs poorly in school and has a keen interest in sports. He is shown to care deeply about his friends.

A friend of Yatora's from high school. He is tall, quiet, and intimidating on the outside, but over time reveals his sensitivity, dreams, and emotional character to Yatora.

Another of Yatora's friends from high school. He does not apply himself academically but is very interested in girls and highly devoted to his friends.

Yatora's classmate at prep school.

Yatora's classmate at prep school.

Yatora's classmate at prep school. She always wears her school uniform to prep school, which is revealed to be to save money. 

A member of Yatora's high school art club.

A member of Yatora's high school art club.

A member of Yatora's high school art club.

Media

Manga
Blue Period is written and illustrated by Tsubasa Yamaguchi. The series began in Kodansha's seinen manga magazine Monthly Afternoon on June 24, 2017. Kodansha has collected its chapters into individual tankōbon volumes. The first volume was released on December 22, 2017. As of November 22, 2022, thirteen volumes have been released.

In North America, Kodansha USA announced the print release of the manga in November 2019.

Volume list

Anime
An anime television series adaptation was announced on January 19, 2021. Seven Arcs is animating the series, with Koji Masunari serving as chief director, and Katsuya Asano serving as director, with scripts by Reiko Yoshida, character designs by Tomoyuki Shitaya, and music by Ippei Inoue. While the series had an advanced streaming debut on Netflix on September 25, 2021, it aired on television from October 2 to December 18 of the same year on the Super Animeism block on MBS, TBS and other channels. Netflix is streaming the series on a weekly schedule outside of Japan since October 9, 2021. Omoinotake performed the opening theme "EVERBLUE," while Mol-74 performed the ending theme "Replica".

Episode list

Reception
As of November 2021, the manga had over 4.5 million copies in circulation.

Blue Period was one of the Jury Recommended Works at the 22nd and 24th Japan Media Arts Festival in 2019 and 2021, respectively. In 2019, the manga was nominated for the 12th Manga Taishō and the 43rd Kodansha Manga Award for Best General Manga. In 2020, the manga won the 13th Manga Taishō and the 44th Kodansha Manga Award for Best General Manga. It was also nominated for the 24th Tezuka Osamu Cultural Prize.

The series ranked #4 on Takarajimasha's Kono Manga ga Sugoi! list of best manga of 2019 for male readers, ranked #14, along with The Fable on the 2020 list; and ranked #15, along with Bōkyō Tarō on the 2021 list. It ranked #16 on the 2019 "Book of the Year" list by Da Vinci magazine; it ranked #19 on the 2020 list; and #24 on the 2021 list. The series was also one of twelve manga series to make the 2021 Young Adult Library Services Association's top 126 graphic novels for teenagers list.

Rebecca Silverman from Anime News Network gave the first volume a B+. She praised its coming-of-age narrative and characters (specifically the adults), while criticizing it for being too informative at times.

Notes

References

External links
 
 

Animeism
Art in anime and manga
Coming-of-age anime and manga
Drama anime and manga
Kodansha manga
Manga Taishō
Netflix original anime
School life in anime and manga
Seinen manga
Seven Arcs
Winner of Kodansha Manga Award (General)